The Canal Tunnels are a pair of single track railway tunnels in north London which connect the East Coast Main Line to London St Pancras International Thameslink. Their name comes from the Regent's Canal, which they pass closely beneath.

Constructed as one element of the overarching Thameslink Programme, the Canal Tunnels enabled trains to travel directly from Peterborough and Cambridge to St Pancras, along with numerous other stations in London, Gatwick Airport and down to Brighton and Horsham. They were constructed between 2004 and 2006, while fitting-out was performed between 2013 and 2014. The first services were run through the Canal Tunnels during February 2018, while its official opening occurred three months later. The Canal Tunnels run from Belle Isle Junction, north of London King's Cross, to Canal Junction.

Construction 
The Canal Tunnels were constructed as part of the wider Thameslink Programme; a £6 billion project to upgrade and expand the north-south railway crossing the capital. They were the first main limb of Thameslink to commence construction. Their main purpose is to link the East Coast Main Line (ECML) with the Thameslink network; a junction connecting the tunnels northern approach to the ECML is 100 metres from the northern portals.

The tunnels were designed by Halcrow Group, part of the Rail Link Engineering consortium, with safety and resilience in mind. The construction process itself took roughly two years, with civil works commencing in 2004 and completed in 2006. Design and construction of the tunnels were planned to integrate with the adjacent railway engineering works for the Channel Tunnel Rail Link High Speed 1 and redevelopment of the Railway Lands and St Pancras railway station. The tunnels were driven using tunnel boring machines (TBMs). The tunnels have a maximal incline of 1 in 34; the nadir is  next to the main sump system.

Power is normally from supplies for the nearby Midland Main Line however provisions to use those of the ECML were made. For safety reasons, emergency service radio systems have been installed, along with a walkway and automated LED lighting at four-metre intervals for an escape route for any passenger evacuation of the tunnel. On account of the Regent Canal being above, flood management measures were built, including a drainage system with a large sump beneath the tunnel, which is pumped into the ECML's drainage system. The infrastructure has been designed to facilitate bi-directional working for greater operational flexibility.

Despite their problem-free completion, the Canal Tunnels remained unused for several years. This was largely due to their having been completed well in advance of numerous other Thameslink elements, such as delivery of the new British Rail Class 700 multiple units ordered for the service and other infrastructure works. During this interval, the installation of track, power supply, and signalling systems were performed ahead of the commencement of passenger services. In August 2012, railway infrastructure owner Network Rail announced that the construction company Carillion had been appointed as the principal contractor for the fitting-out of the Canal Tunnels.

The fitting-out process commenced during 2013 and was completed during the following year, despite this milestone occurring several years ahead of services running; this was reportedly to facilitate stock movements and to take advantage of available land to facilitate such work. The signalling systems installed were integrated with Thameslink's High Capacity Infrastructure; in addition to conventional colour light signalling, the European Train Control System is present; Thameslink officials claimed that this arrangement was the world's first implementation of such technology on a mainline 'heavy' railway. Wherever possible all wiring, mechanical, and electrical equipment was cleanly run in a pair of interior troughs. Amongst the last elements of the work was the connection of the new track to the existing lines via the insertion of new junctions.

Services 

On 26 February 2018, the first passenger service traversed the Canal Tunnels after many out-of-service trains had done so for testing. The tunnels were officially opened to traffic during May 2018, forming a part of the Thameslink core route from that month onwards. Until then, capacity had been limited to 16 trains per hour from Bedford, /Luton Airport Parkway and St Albans City southbound via the Midland Main Line; the presence of the Canal Tunnels added another 8 per hour from Cambridge and Peterborough, achieving the objective of a peak service of 24 trains per hour between St Pancras and Blackfriars. Many of these movements are automated, making use of the route's advanced digital signalling.

References

External links
 Case Study on the Canal Tunnels via swordgroup.co.uk
 Thameslink 2000 tunnels via researchgate.net

Railway tunnels in London
Railway tunnels in England
2006 establishments in England
Rail infrastructure in London